The Drăgășani Wine Museum is a museum located at 22 Gib Mihăescu Street, Drăgășani, Romania.

The building housing the museum was completed before 1920 by Dumitru C. Popescu, a prosperous local merchant. It features the Neo-Brâncovenesc style. Early on, it was used for stores. After the onset of the communist regime, the local Militia was headquartered there. Converted into a museum in 1974, it opened to the public in 1983.

The museum traces its origins to the period after World War I, when a small display existed in a school. In 1952, two residents began putting together a collection. The current display focuses on the regional wine industry, and is divided into three sections: wine production, art, and archaeology.

The museum is listed as a historic monument by Romania's Ministry of Culture and Religious Affairs.

Notes

External links
 Official site 

Drăgășani
Historic monuments in Vâlcea County
Wine museums
Police stations in Romania
Museums established in 1974
1974 establishments in Romania
Museums in Vâlcea County
Neo-Brâncovenesc architecture
Romanian wine